Penelope Jane Johnson CBE (born 23 June 1956) has been Director of the Government Art Collection since 1997.

She was educated at St. Helen's School, the University of East Anglia (BA, 1978) and the University of Manchester. She was made a CBE in the 2010 New Year Honours.

References

1956 births
Living people
People educated at St Helen's School
Alumni of the University of East Anglia
Alumni of the University of Manchester
Commanders of the Order of the British Empire